Balance and Timing is Before Braille's fourth studio recording, released as a "Holiday EP" in 2004 by Sunset Alliance and Bad News Bears Records.

Reception

Critical reception
Stephen Carradini at independentclauses.com loved the record, exclaiming "I wish they would make more music like this, as it’s simply stunning." Chelsea Ide at the Phoenix New Times observed that through the Balance and Timing EP, Before Braille's "honesty and musical versatility" was able to "elicit a range of different emotions."  Finally, the bloggers at Cougar Microbes called this release one of "a string of amazing releases" that "showcases frontman David Jensen‘s knack for a melody and sharp lyrical wit."

However, David Cobb at Splendidzine.com did not feel that the record met expectations. According to him, the "Balance and Timing EP is a reasonably good 'me too' to Jimmy Eat World's discography, but that's Before Braille's only substantial accomplishment so far."

Radio play and commercial success
Because of its "Christmas-themed" single, Merry Christmas, I'm Cheating, this little EP put Before Braille into the regular radio rotation in the Phoenix metro area during the holiday season.<ref>Ching, Albert. [http://blogs.ocweekly.com/heardmentality/2008/12/musical_advent_calendar_before.php Musical Advent Calendar: Before Braille, "Merry Christmas, I'm Cheating" OC Weekly, Dec. 9, 2008]  retrieved 02-06-12</ref>

In addition, some of the tracks included on this EP ultimately found themselves on Tired of Not Being Away From Here'', which made at least a 5-week run on the CMJ 200 charts, peaking at number 77.

Track listing

References

External links
 Before Braille 
 Sunset Alliance Records 

2004 EPs
Before Braille albums
Sunset Alliance Records albums